The 2010–11 Super League Greece was the 75th season of the highest football league of Greece and the fifth under the name Super League. The league consisted of 16 teams, the 13 best teams of the 2009–10 season and three teams that had been promoted from the 2009–10 Beta Ethniki.

The season began on 27 August 2010 with the first matches of the regular season and ended on 25 May 2011 with the last matches of the European playoff round. Panathinaikos were the defending champions, having won their 20th Greek championship in the 2009–10 season.

The season was marred by Koriopolis, a match-fixing scandal which involved several teams from the top three leagues of Greek football.

Season overview

Title race
The league was won by Olympiacos, who earned their 38th Greek league title. They finished with a 13-point lead over runners-up Panathinaikos, who had to compete in a play-off round which determined the exact allocation of spots for both European competitions.

Panathinaikos was joined in the play-offs by third-placed club and city rivals AEK Athens, fourth-placed PAOK and fifth-placed Olympiacos Volos. Panathinaikos eventually won the play-off group and thus earned the second Greek spot in the 2011–12 UEFA Champions League. Since AEK had already won the 2010–11 Greek Cup competition a few weeks earlier and thus were already qualified for the 2011–12 UEFA Europa League, both PAOK and Olympiacos Volos were guaranteed a spot in that competition as well.

Relegation

After thirty matches, the relegation spots were occupied by 14th-placed Asteras Tripolis, 15th-placed AEL and last-placed Panserraikos. However, all three clubs eventually stayed in the league after Iraklis, Kavala and Olympiacos Volos were demoted by separate sports court decisions.

On 19 May 2011, Iraklis were denied a licence for the 2011–12 season over unpaid debts and thus demoted to the second-level Football League. Soon afterwards, the Thessaloniki club was found guilty of having forged documents during the winter transfer window and put at the end of the standings.

A few days after the Iraklis verdict, it became evident that several clubs and officials throughout the top leagues of Greek football were involved in a match-fixing scandal. Investigations in the matter were taken all summer. On 28 July 2011, Kavala and Olympiacos Volos were found guilty of having taken part in illegal actions and were therefore demoted to the Football League. However, both clubs appealed to the decision and they stayed at the Super League Greece, though they were deducted 8 and 10 points respectively. On 11 August 2011, UEFA disqualified Olympiacos Volos from further participation in the UEFA Europa League. On 23 August 2011, the Professional Sports Committee stripped Kavala and Olympiacos Volos of their professional licence due to their chairmen's involvement in the scandal.

Teams
Levadiakos, PAS Giannina and Panthrakikos had been relegated at the end of the 2009–10 season after finishing in the bottom three places of the league table. Levadiakos concluded a four-year run in the highest football league of Greece. Panthrakikos finished a two-year tenure with the league, while PAS Giannina had to return to the Football League, formerly known as Beta Ethniki, after just one season.

The three relegated teams were replaced by 2009–10 Beta Ethniki champions Olympiacos Volos, runners-up Kerkyra and promotion playoff winners Panserraikos. Olympiacos Volos returned to the Greek top football level after 20 seasons. Kerkyra ended a three-year absence from the Super League, while Panserraikos immediately returned to the league.

Stadia and locations

Notes
 AEL moved to AEL FC Arena upon its completion in December 2010. Previous matches were hosted at Alcazar Stadium.

Personnel and kits

Managerial changes

Regular season

League table

Results

Play-offs
In the play-off for Champions League, the four teams play each other in a home and away round robin. However, they do not all start with 0 points. Instead, a weighting system applies to the teams' standing at the start of the play-off mini-league. The team finishing fifth in the Super League will start the play-off with 0 points. The fifth placed team's end of season tally of points is subtracted from the sum of the points that other teams have. This number is then divided by five and rounded to the nearest whole number of points, if necessary, to give the other teams the points with which they start the mini-league.

Fifth-placed club Olympiacos Volos earned 47 points during the regular season. Based on this number and the calculations above, Panathinaikos as runners-up will began the play-offs with three points ((60–47)/5 = 2.6, rounded up to 3), while AEK Athens started with one point ((50–47)/5 = 0.6, rounded up to 1) and PAOK with no points ((48–47)/5 = 0.2, rounded down to 0).

Season statistics

Top scorers

''Including matches played on 17 April 2011; Source: Soccerway

Top assists

Awards

Annual awards
Annual awards were announced on 18  January 2012

Player of the Year  

The Player of the Year awarded to  Ariel Ibagaza (Olympiacos)

Foreign Player of the Year  

The Foreign Player of the Year awarded to  Vieirinha (PAOK)

Top goalscorer of the Year   

The Top goalscorer of the Year awarded to  Djibril Cissé (Panathinaikos)

Greek Player of the Year  

The Greek Player of the Year awarded to  Avram Papadopoulos (Olympiacos)

Manager of the Year  

The Manager of the Year awarded to  Ernesto Valverde (Olympiacos)

Young Player of the Year  

The Young Player of the Year awarded to  Giannis Fetfatzidis (Olympiacos)

Goalkeeper of the Year  

The Goalkeeper of the Year awarded to  Michalis Sifakis (Aris)

References

External links
Official website 

Super League Greece seasons
1
Greece